American rock band Unwritten Law has released seven studio albums, two live albums, two EPs, two video albums, eleven singles, one demo, and thirteen music videos.

Unwritten Law formed in 1990 in Poway, California with an initial lineup of singer Scott Russo, guitarists Steve Morris and Rob Brewer, bassist John Bell, and drummer Wade Youman. They released their six-song demo in 1992 and the EP Blurr in 1993. Their debut album Blue Room was released in 1994 through local label Red Eye Records. The band then signed to Epic Records, who re-released Blue Room and put out 1996's Oz Factor, supported by singles for "Lame", "Denied", and "Superman", the latter of which became the band's first music video. Bell then left the group and the band signed to Interscope Records, bringing in Pivit bassist Micah Albao for the recording of 1998's Unwritten Law. By the time of the album's release Pat "PK" Kim had become their permanent bassist. Unwritten Law was their first album to chart, reaching #16 on Billboard's Heatseekers Albums chart, and spawned five music videos: "Teenage Suicide", "California Sky", "Holiday", "Cailin", and "Lonesome". "Cailin" and "Lonesome" were released as singles, the former being Unwritten Law's first song to chart, reaching #28 on the Alternative Songs chart. In 1999 they released the Visit to Oz EP in Australia, coinciding with their first headlining tour there.

The band's fourth album was 2002's Elva, their first to chart on the Billboard 200, reaching #69. "Up All Night" and "Seein' Red" were both released as singles, the latter becoming the highest-charting song of the band's career by reaching the #1 spot on the Alternative Songs chart. The group then moved to Lava Records and released 2003's Music in High Places, a live acoustic album recorded in Yellowstone National Park for the VH1 series of the same name, which spawned a charting single for "Rest of My Life". Youman was then ejected from the band, so Adrian Young and Tony Palermo played drums on the recording of Here's to the Mourning (2005). Palermo joined the band permanently, and the singles for "Save Me (Wake Up Call)" and "She Says" from the album both reached the Alternative Songs chart, the former being the band's second-highest-charting song at #5. Brewer was fired from Unwritten Law in 2005 and the band continued as a quartet.

In 2006 Interscope released 20th Century Masters: The Millennium Collection, a compilation of tracks from Unwritten Law and Elva. Unwritten Law followed by releasing their own greatest hits album, The Hit List, on Abydos Records in 2007. Consisting mostly of re-recorded versions of songs from their back catalog, it reached #10 on the Independent Albums chart. No singles were released from this album, but a music video was filmed for the new track "Shoulda Known Better". Palermo then left Unwritten Law for Papa Roach and was replaced by Dylan Howard. The band signed to Suburban Noize Records, releasing the live album and DVD Live and Lawless in 2008 and their sixth studio album, Swan, in 2011.

Albums

Studio albums

Live albums

Compilation albums

Demo albums

Extended plays

Singles

Video albums

Music videos

Other appearances 
The following Unwritten Law songs were released on compilation albums, soundtracks, and other releases. This is not an exhaustive list.

Official bootlegs

References

External links 
 

Discography
Discographies of American artists
Rock music group discographies